Jaime de Conchillos, O. de M. (died 4 Aug 1542) was a Roman Catholic priest who served as Bishop of Lérida (1512–1542),
Bishop of Catania (1509–1512),
Bishop of Gerace (1505–1509), and 
Prelate of Santa Lucia del Mela (1505).

Biography
Jaime de Conchillos was ordained a priest in the Order of the Blessed Virgin Mary of Mercy and in 1505, he was appointed by Pope Julius II as Prelate of Santa Lucia del Mela. 
On 23 Feb 1505, he was appointed by Pope Julius II as Bishop of Gerace. 
On 25 Feb 1509, he was appointed by Pope Julius II as Bishop of Catania. 
On 1 Oct 1512, he was appointed by Pope Julius II as Bishop of Lérida where he served until his death on 4 Aug 1542.

See also
Catholic Church in Spain

References

External links and additional sources
 (for Chronology of Bishops) 
 (for Chronology of Bishops) 
(for Chronology of Bishops) 
 (for Chronology of Bishops) 
 (for Chronology of Bishops) 
 (for Chronology of Bishops) 
 (for Chronology of Bishops) 
 (for Chronology of Bishops) 

1542 deaths
Bishops appointed by Pope Julius II
Mercedarian bishops
Bishops of Lleida